Lars Pörschke (born 17 June 1984) is a former German tennis player.

Pörschke has a career high ATP singles ranking of 277 achieved on 30 November 2009. He also has a career high ATP doubles ranking of 315 achieved on 28 December 2009.

Pörschke made his ATP main draw debut at the 2009 SAP Open after receiving a wildcard into the singles main draw.

References

External links

1984 births
Living people
German male tennis players
Sportspeople from Giessen
Tennis people from Hesse